Chioma Omeruah, (born 14 May 1976) best known as Chigul, is a Nigerian comedian, singer and actress who is known for her accents and comedic characters.

Life and career
Omeruah was born in Lagos to Igbo parents. She moved away whilst still a baby. She is the second  child of four children of Air Commodore Samson Omeruah.

She had her primary and secondary education in Lagos during her secondary school days she attended two Air Force secondary schools one in Jos and the other in Ikeja, Lagos. After her secondary school, she entered Abia State University (ABSU). She attended ABSU for three months. In 1994, she left ABSU to study Criminal Law at Delaware State University, ⁣ at her father's request. This was not a success, so she left after two years to study French Education at Delaware State University. Omeruah is a polyglot and can speak 5 languages fluently. She returned to Nigeria after twelve years in America.

She initially became a singer under the name C-Flow, but this has been subsumed by her characters - principal of which is Chigul. Chigul speaks in a strong Igbo accent. Chigul was first heard as a recording of the song "Kilode" sent by Omeruah to her friends, but the sound was soon re-sent around Nigeria. Chigul has been married, but this ended with no joint children.

Omeruah has twelve characters, but she is known as "Chigul" after her most well-known invention. She has been interviewed and lauded by a number of media outlets. She had given a TEDx talk and appeared as a character in the Nollywood film Road to Yesterday. In 2015 she appeared as a guest on the single "Karishika" by Falz. She was a 2014 honouree as the “Comedienne of The Year” at The Sisterhoods Award Ceremony.

In May 2020, Omeruah appeared in the Visual Collaborative electronic catalogue, in an issue called TwentyEightyFour, she was featured in the same issue with Dakore Akande, Oliver Nakakande and Coppé.

Filmography
Out of Luck (2015)
Remember me (2016)
The Wedding Party 2 (2017)
Wives on Strike: The Revolution (2017)
Banana Island Ghost (2017)
Road to Yesterday (2015)
Chief Daddy (2018)
Crazy People (2018)
The Ghost and the Tout (2018)
She is (2019)
Omo Ghetto-The Saga (2020)
This is my Desire (2020)
Charge and Bail (2021)
Chief Daddy 2: Going for Broke

Awards and nominations

See also
 List of Igbo people
 List of Nigerian comedians
 List of Nigerian actresses

References

1976 births
Living people
Residents of Lagos
Nigerian comedians
Nigerian film actresses
Nigerian women comedians
Nigerian women singers
Nigerian expatriates in the United States
Delaware State University alumni
Igbo actresses
Abia State University alumni